St. Andrew's International School in Blantyre, Malawi, was founded 1938 by the Church of Scotland Mission in Blantyre. The high school in its present form was established in 1958. SAIntS is a British International School offering (i) GCSE, A Level and BTEC qualifications and a wealth of extra-curricular opportunities.

History
It was founded as a series of mission schools in Limbe, Blantyre and Zomba in Nyasaland (Malawi)in the 1920s just after the First World War.

Three distinct schools
With the need to further education, the school split into three parts creating a distinct kindergarten, primary school and a high school in three locations in 1957.(The High School opened on 28 January 1957)

Saint Andrews High School
The high school came to be known as Saint Andrews High School (SAHS)in 1958. In 1965, a year after Malawian Independence, the school changed its name to "St. Andrew's Secondary School" (SASS).

Saint Andrew's International High School (SAIntS)
Today, Saints is an exclusive school located in the Nyambadwe suburb of Blantyre, Malawi, and has 520 students from more than 30 nationalities as part of its day and boarding school.

Cricket ground

In November 2019, it was named as one of the venues to host 2019 T20 Kwacha Cup, a Twenty20 International (T20I) cricket tournament.

Academics
Students study British style curriculum including GCSE/IGCSE, BTECs and A levels.

Houses and clubs
The school consists of various houses and clubs; such as Chiradzulu, Michiru, Ndirande and Soche, named after the mountains surrounding Blantyre.

Boarding
Approximately 105 students are boarders. There are separate boys' and girls' hostels and a dedicated team of boarding supervisors.

Accomplishments
 In 2003, the school was noted in the African Almanac as one of the top 100 schools in Africa.
 Its swimming program trained Malawian Olympic swimmer, Joyce Tafatatha.

Alumni
Saints has an active alumni chapter in Malawi, Australia, and South Africa. A publication by former students of the federation era (federation of Rhodesia and Nyasaland), The Federal Saints Journal, is distributed to Saints alumni in over 40 countries world wide.

Notable alumni

Tapps Bandawe, music producer
Lillian Koreia Mpatsa
Billy Abner Mayaya -Theologist, civil rights activist
Yvonne Mhango - Economist
Austin Muluzi - Minister of Economic Development
Kimba Mutanda - Rapper
Vanessa Nsona - Fashion Designer, entrepreneur
Joyce Tafatatha - Malawian Olympic Swimmer
Chapanga (Peter) Wilson - Poet
Ammara Pinto - Olympic swimmer
Eve Jardine-Young - Principal Cheltenham Ladies' College

Notable educators
Aaron Sangala, Music and French Teacher

References

External links
 
 Isbi schools St Andrew's International High School, Blantyre
 Federal SAInts 

Schools in Malawi
International high schools
Presbyterian schools in Africa
Church of Scotland
1958 establishments in Nyasaland
Educational institutions established in 1958